Shivapuri is a Rural municipality located within the Nuwakot District of the Bagmati Province of Nepal.
The municipality spans  of area, with a total population of 20,769 according to a 2011 Nepal census.

On March 10, 2017, the Government of Nepal restructured the local level bodies into 753 new local level structures.
The previous Talakhu, Chhap, Likhu, Sikre Mahakali, Samundradevi, Sunakhani and Thanapati VDCs were merged to form Shivapuri Rural Municipality.
Shivapuri is divided into 8 wards, with Likhu declared the administrative center of the rural municipality.

References

External links
official website of the rural municipality

Rural municipalities in Nuwakot District
Rural municipalities of Nepal established in 2017